Suzanne Boorsch (born June 29, 1937) is an American art historian, who specializes in Renaissance old master prints, as well as the art of Giorgio Ghisi, Andrea Mantegna, and Francesco Vanni. Boorsch is the Robert L. Solley Curator of Prints and Drawings at the Yale University Art Gallery.

Career
Born to Jean Boorsch, Street Professor Emeritus of Romance Languages at Yale University, and Louise Totten, Boorsch received a Bachelor of Arts from Smith College in 1958. She then continued on to receive a Master of Arts in 1974 and a Master of Philosophy in 1977, both from New York University Institute of Fine Arts.

Boorsch began her career as Assistant Curator of Prints and Photographs at the Metropolitan Museum of Art. Boorsch then became the Robert L. Solley Curator of Prints and Drawings at the Yale University Art Gallery.

Works
The Engravings of Giorgio Ghisi, 1985,  
Andrea Mantegna, 1992, 
The French Renaissance in Prints, 1994, 
Venetian Prints and Books in the Age of Tiepolo, 1997, 
Master Drawings from the Yale University Art Gallery, 2006,

References

External links
Yale University profile

Living people
1937 births
21st-century American women
American people of French descent
Smith College alumni
New York University Institute of Fine Arts alumni
American art curators
American art historians
American women curators
Women art historians
People associated with the Metropolitan Museum of Art
Yale University people